This is a list of named volcanic surface features on Jupiter's moon Io.  These names have been approved for use by the International Astronomical Union.  The features listed below represent a subset of the total known volcanic features on Io's surface with the majority currently not having an officially approved name.

The names of volcanic features on Io use a combination of a name derived from mythological figures from around the world related to the Sun, fire, volcanoes, thunder, or smithing, places from the Greek mythological story of Io, Dante's Inferno, or from the name of a nearby feature on Io's surface and an approved descriptive term.  The descriptive term used is based on the type of feature named and how it was first discovered.  Volcanoes that were first observed as an active feature from observations of a volcanic plume fit under the category of "Eruptive Center" and do not use a descriptive term, though portions of these features may have also received names that do use a descriptive term, like Prometheus Patera or Masubi Fluctus.  Lava flows use the descriptive term fluctus or the plural fluctūs, e.g. Acala Fluctus.  Volcanic depressions use the term patera or the plural paterae, e.g. Ah Peku Patera.  The term has also become the generic term for referring to these structures.  Small shield volcanoes use the term tholus or the plural tholi, e.g. Inachus Tholus.  Finally, channels carved by volcanic lava flows through thermal erosion use the term vallis or the plural valles.

See also the list of mountains on Io and the list of regions on Io.

Eruptive centers 
Eruptive centers on Io are locations typically where major volcanic activity was observed and characterized before the volcanic landform was.  Coordinate, diameter, and name source come from the IAU's Solar System Nomenclature Website.  All of these features have been observed as active volcanoes on Io.

Paterae 

The following table lists named volcanic depressions or paterae on Io.  Coordinate, diameter, and name source come from the IAU's Solar System Nomenclature Website.  Notes on whether the patera has been observed as an active volcano by either ground-based astronomers, the Hubble Space Telescope, or the various spacecraft that have encountered the Jupiter system come from the book, Volcanism on Io, unless otherwise noted.

In 2006, the use of the term catena , for Ionian volcanoes with multiple depressions, was discontinued in favor of the plural paterae .  These features are Tvashtar Paterae, Reshet Paterae, and Mazda Paterae.

Lava flows 
Ionian fluctūs (areas of lava flow) are named after fire and thunder gods in various mythologies, or after locations in Greek mythology associated with Io.  Coordinate, length, and name source come from the IAU's Solar System Nomenclature Website.  Notes on whether the lava flow has been observed as part of an active volcano by either ground-based astronomers, the Hubble Space Telescope, or the various spacecraft that have encountered the Jupiter system come from the book, Volcanism on Io, unless otherwise noted.

Shield volcanoes 
Ionian shield volcanoes or tholi are named after mythological figures associated with fire or with the nymph Io.

Lava channels 
Ionian lava channels that cut into the surrounding terrain use the term vallis.

References 

USGS Planetary Nomenclature: Io